Anthony William Coviello, known professionally as Anthony William or the Medical Medium, is a self-proclaimed medium who offers pseudoscientific medical and health advice based on alleged communication with a Spirit. He authors books and offers advice online on forums such as Gwyneth Paltrow's Goop column and his own website.
William believes that the Epstein-Barr virus is responsible for multiple ailments, including cancer. He claims to be the originator of the lemon juice in water morning detox as well as the celery juice fad, which he claims can offer many health benefits. Critics allege that he is practicing medicine without a license and that he has, at times, improperly solicited positive Amazon reviews for his books.

Early life
William has described that he first received his expertise through a connection to "Spirit" when he was four years old. He claims that he correctly diagnosed his grandmother with lung cancer, and often healed family and friends throughout his childhood.

Career
William uses the title "Medical Medium" about himself. He has published 8 books, and has been on the New York Times bestselling list. He is a writer for Gwyneth Paltrow's Goop, for which he is considered a "trusted expert." He has nearly 3 million followers on Instagram as of 2021 and has 3.5 million followers on Facebook as of 2021.

His website contains at least 177 revenue-generating affiliate links to Amazon products, such as nutritional supplements. According to the legal disclaimers on his site as well as on his Goop articles, William has no certifications of scientific or medical training. He has also published a disclaimer saying that his suggestions should not be a substitute for medical advice. He has frequently been solicited by the traditional press for comments, but appears to infrequently engage with journalists.

Claims and practice

Psychic connection and angels
William states that his connection to Spirit presents itself as a voice outside of his head, next to his right ear. His connection to Spirit gives him the ability to scan bodies in a way that can diagnose all blockages, infections, trouble areas, past problems, and even soul fractures with knowledge that comes from Spirit. This assists in his claimed ability to diagnose other people of various illnesses as well as offer treatment.

In his book, Life-Changing Foods, there is a dedicated chapter to angels. He explains that he believes in the existence of twelve different angels, with names such as the Angel of Abundance and the Angel of Addiction. He encourages his followers to invoke the names of specific angels to ask for help in various circumstances.

Cancer and Epstein-Barr virus

One of the health issues that William most frequently diagnoses is chronic disease that occurs from the Epstein–Barr virus, for which he prescribes a treatment of B12 vitamins that Spirit recommends, along with high doses of celery juice. He asserts that the virus can be transmitted in utero. Current scientific evidence suggests that it is most often transmitted via saliva.

William says, in his Goop column, that "ninety-eight percent of the time, cancer is caused by a virus and at least one type of toxin." He attributes many cancers to the Epstein-Barr virus, and claims that this virus is "responsible for breast cancer, liver cancer, almost all lung cancer, pancreatic cancer, colon cancer, prostate cancer, women's reproductive cancers, leukemia, and many more.” William feels strongly that the cancers we face today are something that has advanced rapidly recently, specifically since the Industrial Revolution. He also contends that cancer as a whole has no genetic component, despite scientific evidence to the contrary. William also suggests that the Epstein-Barr virus causes over 95% of thyroid issues, no current scientific evidence supports this view.

According to the CDC, there is no current peer-reviewed scientific evidence to support William's assertions that the Epstein-Barr virus causes lung cancer. The American Cancer Society has noted that the Epstein-Barr virus might possibly be linked to Hodgkin's lymphoma or certain stomach cancers, but this is still undetermined.

Food and diet
In his book, Life Changing Foods, he considers "fruits, vegetables, herbs and spices, and wild foods" to be the Holy Four. He states:

Against these Holy Four he positions the Unforgiving Four, which are radiation, toxic heavy metals, the viral explosion, and DDT. Of these, he suggests that they "ravage our bodies, make us question our own sanity, and push us to the breaking point as a society."

William says that there are two kinds of Living Water. "Hydrobioactive water" is found in all of the Holy Four foods and can hydrate a person more than tap water. He also suggests there is a cofactor in water which "contains information to help restore your soul and spirit and to support your emotions."

He also describes six foods which he considers to be life-challenging. He contends that dairy bogs down the liver; eggs feed the viral explosion; corn is no longer nutritious due to overuse of genetic modification; wheat feeds pathogens; canola oil destroys the lining of the stomach, veins, and heart; and that food additives described or labeled as "natural flavors" are actually a neurotoxin called MSG which destroy brain and nerve cells over time.

Celery juice

William is the originator of the celery juice diet, and journalistic research has led others to conclude that he is the primary source. William believes that "the science behind the healing powers of celery juice is just yet to be discovered." Currently none of William's claims can be proven.

William claims that celery juice has medicinal uses. He suggests that it can "improve energy levels," reduce bloating, increase "clarity of mind," and even improve such conditions as headaches and anxiety. The juice is supposed to be extra hydrating, "inflammation-reducing and microbiome-sustaining." He also calls it "a miracle juice" and "one of the greatest healing tonics of all time." None of these claims is supported by scientific evidence, and no dietitians or other members of the medical community are supportive of these claims.

In an interview with UK's Evening Standard William describes how to make celery juice. He claims it has "healing powers" and explains that it is difficult to make.

William explains that the juice must be pure, so not even a squeeze of lemon juice or a mixture of other vegetables is permitted. The juice should be consumed on an empty stomach, first thing in the morning. He recommends doing exactly 16 ounces of juice to start, and working up to 32 ounces, twice a day. He says that it should be ingested at least 15–20 minutes before consuming other food.

Amanda Mull, of The Atlantic, interviewed two registered dietitians on the benefits of celery juice. They agreed that celery is a healthy snack, and that there is some evidence that celery may have benefits for managing blood pressure, but these benefits were observed when patients ate full stalks. One dietitian remarked, "there is no one food that will cure your cancer, inflammatory disease, or other ailment, so don't believe the hype you see and hear on Instagram."

Dietitian and Nutritionist, Marika Day, says of William's celery juice claims:

Nutritionist Rhiannon Lambert of Harley Street also weighed in to point out that fiber is an important part of diet, and this is lost in the juicing process. She states that there is no current evidence for these more "magical claims" of celery juice, only anecdotal evidence. Australian dietitian Stefanie Valakas, interviewed by a reporter with news.com.au, also states that there is no evidence for these health claims and that any fiber benefits of celery are lost in the juicing process. Both remark that one is likely to get the same nutritional benefit from drinking a glass of water and eating a balanced diet.

Although most medical professionals agree that the potential harm in adding celery juice to one's diet is likely minimal, there is the possibility of a negative reaction with certain medications. Celery contains Vitamin K, which can potentially affect medications, such as Warfarin, if intake suddenly increases. There is also a potential risk of bloating and diarrhea for those suffering from IBS.

Ginger Hultin, a dietitian and spokesperson Academy of Nutrition and Dietetics, commenting on the celery juice phenomena, warns it is dangerous to attempt to fight diseases as many proponents of celery juice claim to do.

Dietitian Carrie Dennett has commented that William has no medical training and that although research has confirmed anti-inflammatory benefits from isolated phytochemicals found in celery, no research supports William's popular claims about celery.

Other
William also claims that infertility is treatable with such practices as "creative visualizations, walking meditations, and breathing exercises," which will "draw white light into the reproductive organs."

Controversy and criticism

Goop
In an investigative article in Inverse in January 2018, Gwyneth Paltrow's company Goop was criticized for posting articles by William and featuring him as their "trusted expert" despite his lack of medical credentials.

Soliciting Amazon reviews
Jonathan Jarry, of the McGill Office for Science and Society, argues that some of William's accolades are not naturally achieved. For example, he notes that William offered entry into a contest where participants could win autographed books, private consultations, and live show tickets in exchange for positive book reviews on Amazon.

Rae Paoletta, of Inverse, found that William's publisher, Hay House, ran a lottery to give prizes to whoever wrote the "most inspiring" Amazon review for his 2015 book titled "Medical Medium." According to Paoletta, "when Inverse asked Amazon about the accusations of positive book reviews for compensation, a spokesperson confirmed the e-commerce site would be investigating the claims."

Practicing medicine without a license
Jarry also argues that William is practicing medicine without a license. In William's operating state of Florida, the definition of practicing medicine is as follows:

On William's radio shows he allows fans to call in and describe their symptoms. He performs "scans" with his angel guide, and then offers advice to the caller, suggesting things like eliminating certain food groups, taking vitamin B12, or doing a celery juice cleanse. Jarry argues that this constitutes "practicing medicine" based on the aforementioned definition. 

Jarry also describes the case of a woman who, six months after being "scanned" by William on a TV program and found to be completely healthy by "Spirit," was diagnosed with a serious blood disease that William and Spirit were not able to detect.

Other
Jennifer Gunter, an OB/GYN from San Francisco who has criticized Goop in the past, made the following statement regarding William:

Harriet Hall argues that "William's belief system has no grounding in reality or science." She observes that there is no evidence to back up William's claimed divine guidance.

Selected publications

 Medical Medium: Secrets Behind Chronic and Mystery Illness and How to Finally Heal (2015) 
 Medical Medium Life-Changing Foods Save Yourself and the Ones You Love With The Hidden Healing Powers of Fruits & Vegetables (2016) 
 Medical Medium Thyroid Healing The Truth Behind Hashimoto's, Graves', Insomnia, Hypothyroidism, Thyroid Nodules & Epstein-Barr (2017) 
 Medical Medium Liver Rescue: Answers to Eczema, Psoriasis, Diabetes, Strep, Acne, Gout, Bloating, Gallstones, Adrenal Stress, Fatigue, Fatty Liver, Weight Issues, SIBO & Autoimmune Disease (2018) 
 Medical Medium Celery Juice: The Most Powerful Medicine of Our Time Healing Millions Worldwide (2019) 
 Medical Medium Cleanse To Heal: Healing Plans For Sufferers of Anxiety, Depression, Acne, Eczema, Lyme, Gut Problems, Brain Fog, Weight Issues, Migraines, Bloating, Vertigo, Psoriasis, Cysts, Fatigue, PCOS, Fibroids, UTI, Endometriosis & Autoimmune (2020) 
 Brain Saver: Answers to Brain Inflammation, Mental Health, Brain Fog, Neurological Symptoms, ADHD, Anxiety, OCD, Depression, Heavy Metals, Epstein-Barr, Seizures, Lyme Addiction, Alzheimer’s, Autoimmune & Eating Disorders (2022) 
 Medical Medium Brain Saver Protocols, Cleanses & Recipes: For Neurological, Autoimmune & Mental Health (2022)

References

External links

Year of birth missing (living people)

Living people
Alternative cancer treatment advocates
Alternative detoxification promoters
American psychics
American spiritual mediums
Pseudoscientific diet advocates